Gingee, also known as Senji or Jinji and originally called Singapuri, is a panchayat town in Viluppuram district in the Indian state of Tamil Nadu. Gingee is located between three hills covering a perimeter of 3 km, and lies west of the Sankaraparani River.

History
The founding of the Kon dynasty established Gingee Fort as a fortified royal center. The Gingee country then came under the rule of the Hoysalas in the later part of the 13th and in the first half of the 14th century. From the Hoysalas it passed to the first rulers of Vijayanagara empire. The Vijayanagar dominion gradually expanded over South India and divided the  administration into three important provinces, which were under the control of Nayaks. These were the Nayaks of Madurai, Nayaks of Tanjore, and Nayaks of Gingee. Information about the Gingee Nayaks and their rule is very scanty. It is said that Tupakula Krishnappa Nayaka (1490 to 1521) of a Chandragiri family was the founder of the Nayaka line of Gingee kings. He seems to have ruled along the coast from Nellore to the Kollidam River up to 1521. Under the Nayaks the forts were strengthened and the town was greatly enlarged.

The last Nayak of Gingee was forced to surrender to the Bijapur army towards the end of December 1649. The booty acquired by the Muslim rulers of Bijapur was 20 crores of rupees in cash and jewels. gingee assumed a new and enhanced strategic importance under the Bijapur governors. Bijapur was in possession of the fortress of Senji till 1677, when the Maratha leader Chhtrapati Shivaji Maharaj fell upon it in his Carnatic expedition. The Marathas greatly strengthened and fortified its defences.

The Mughals were then able to capture Gingee Fort from the Maratha king Rajaram early in 1698, after a siege of seven years. Zulfikar Khan, the son of Asad Khan, the Grand Vizir in the court of the Mughal emperor Aurangzeb, was in command of the siege operation of Senji and of its governor till he left the Carnatic after about a year from its fall.

After that Aurangzeb granted a mansab of 2,500 rank and jagir of 12 lakhs to Raja Swarup Singh, his Bundela Rajput servant, along with the killedari (Fort Commandership) of Gingee in 1700. Raja Swarup Singh died of old age in 1714. His arrears of payments due to the faujdari amounted to 70 lakhs, being a defaulter for ten years. The Nawab of Arcot reported this matter to the Mughal emperor at Delhi. Hearing about the death of his father, Desingh, the son of Raja Swarup Singh, started for Gingee from Bundelkhand, his ancestral home.

On arriving at Gingee, Desingh assumed the government of Gingee after performing the last rites of his father. Aurangazeb had granted a firman to his father and Desingh took formal possession of his father's jagir on ground of his hereditary right. Desingh did not receive a warm welcome from the Mughal officers. The Nawab of Arcot, Sadatullah Khan, who attempted to dispossess Desingh, pleaded that the firman was not valid. When Payya Ramakrishna, who was his secretary, informed him of the legal necessity of getting the firman renewed by the new Emperor before assuming the jagir, Desingh replied that he had got the firman of Aurangzeb and that he need not apply to anybody else.

In fact after regaining the fort from Marathas, Aurangzeb had first appointed Nawab Daud Khan as the deputy subahdar of the Deccan. Nawab Daud Khan removed his headquarters from Gingee to the town of Arcot, as he believed that the place was not healthy. This diminished the importance of Gingee. While shifting his headquarters, Daud Khan appointed Sadatullah Khan as his Diwan and Faujdar in 1708. Sadatullah Khan later became the Nawab of the two Carnatics in 1713, under Nizam-Ul-Mulk. He was the regular and acknowledged Nawab of the Carnatic between the years 1710 and 1732. After the death of Raja Swarup Singh he renewed the demand for the arrears of revenue with his son Raja Desingh. This led to a battle between the two, which unfortunately ended in the death of the young and valiant Rajput, Desingh on 3 October 1714. He struggled at the young age of 22, against the powerful Nawab Sadatulla Khan of Arcot in a struggle that was hopeless from the outset (Desingh's army consisted of only 350 horses and 500 troopers, while the Nawab's army had 8,000 horsemen and 10,000 sepoys). Ballads are sung in and around Gingee about his bravery. However, the fortress of Gingee lost its pre-eminent position and political importance within a few years of the extinction of the Rajput rule.

Subsequently, the two European rival powers in India, the English and the French, got themselves involved in the internal quarrels and fights and the French won Gingee for themselves on 11 September 1750, under the initiative of de Bussy, Governor-General of Pondicherry. They took good care to secure the fort by a strong garrison, which was well supported with artillery and ammunition.

Gingee remained firmly in French possession until after the fall of Pondicherry to Sir Eyre Coote in January 1761. The English commander was Captain Stephen Smith. With the fall of Gingee the French lost their last possession in the Carnatic.

Gingee regained its political importance for the last time in 1780, when Hyder Ali of Mysore, helped by some able French officers, invaded Carnatic with a force of 90,000 men. Hyder's men appeared before the fortress and easily carried it by their assault in November 1780. The English re-conquered it at the close of the Second Mysore War from Tipu Sultan in 1799. After that Gingee had been free from the ravages and anarchy of war, but subject to desolation and decay. During the frequent Indo-French Wars, the British resident wanted the fort and the fortification to be demolished. Luckily his suggestion was not accepted and the Fort remains for us to experience and relive the history.

The presence of Muslim rulers in Gingee is evident from the inhabitants of a nearby village called Minambur, where the Urdu speaking Navaitha Muslims living with their unique culture and tribes such as Shakir, Koken, Bhanday Bhonday, Choudary, Pappa, Aghalay, Hazari, Amberkhani, Sayeed etc.

Gingee Fort

Gingee is famous for its Gingee Fort, a popular tourist attraction. The Kon dynasty laid the foundations for the Gingee Fort in 1190 CE. The fort was later built by the Chola dynasty in the 13th century. In 1638, Gingee came under the control of Bijapur Sultanate from Vijayanagar. In 1677, some small portion was under the control of the great Maratha king Chhatrapati Shivaji Maharaj. In 1690, it came under the Mughals, when it became the headquarters of the Carnatic. It changed hands to the French in 1750, and then to the British in 1762. During this time, many sculptural aspects of Gingee were shifted to Pondicherry by the French.

To visit Gingee Fort, guides are available from archaeological office which is on the way to the fort. The office is open for visitors from 9:00 to 17:00 (9am to 5pm). The fee for visitors and tourists for visiting the fort is Rs.10.

Geography
It has an average elevation of 92 metres (301 ft).

The nearest towns with railway stations are Tindivanam, 28 km away, and Thiruvannamalai, 39 km away. Gingee is 147 km from Chennai and 64 km from Pondicherry. National Highway NH 77 connects Krishnagiri and Tindivanam, passes through Gingee and State Highway SH 4 connects Arcot and Villupuram, passes through Gingee.

Demographics

Population

According to the 2011 census, Gingee had a population of 27,045 with a sex-ratio of 975 females for every 1,000 males, much above the national average of 929. A total of 2,893 were under the age of six, constituting 1,470 males and 1,423 females. Scheduled Castes and Scheduled Tribes accounted for 19.8% and 1.12% of the population respectively. The average literacy of the town was 76.4%, compared to the national average of 72.99%. The town had a total of 6,259 households. There were a total of 10.936 workers, comprising 487 cultivators, 640 main agricultural labourers, 414 in house hold industries, 5,721 other workers, 3,664 marginal workers, 45 marginal cultivators, 1,867 marginal agricultural labourers, 330 marginal workers in household industries and 1,442 other marginal workers.

Politics
Gingee assembly constituency is part of Arni (Lok Sabha constituency). Gingee itself a legislative constituency which is currently held by the DMK party and K.S.Masthan is currently the Member of the Legislative Assembly for Senji.

Landmarks
 Shiva temple, situated below the fort, was built in the period of Desingu Raja who was the king of Gingee Fort

 Mel Sithamur Jain Math is a Jain Matha near Gingee. It is the primary religious center of the Tamil Jain community. It is headed by the primary religious head of this community, Bhattaraka Laxmisena Swami. The Viluppuram area has been an important centre of Jainism since ancient times. Historically, there was a Jain Math at Kanchipuram but it was shifted to its current location here.

Gallery

Notes

References

Questioning Ramayanas - by Paula Richman
The Literary Cultures in History - by Sheldon I Pollock
Further Sources of Vijayanagara History By K A Nilakanta Sastry
Penumbral Visions - by Sanjay Subrahmanyam

External links

 Gingee: History and Architecture 
 Gingee Fort

Cities and towns in Viluppuram district
Buildings and structures of the Maratha Empire